Nguyễn Ngọc Phương Vy (born August 27, 1987) is a Vietnamese singer who won the first season of Vietnam Idol, in 2007.

Vietnam Idol
Phương Vy auditioned for Vietnam Idol in Ho Chi Minh City. She proceeded into the top 10 and was never voted into the bottom three. Phương Vy advanced into the final and won the title over Ngọc Ánh on October 3, 2007 with 53.44% of the votes. Upon winning the competition, she was awarded 10,000 USD and signed a recording contract with recording company Music Faces. She did a song with K'naan for the Vietnamese version of Wavin' Flag.

Vietnam Idol Performances
"Mặt Trời Dịu Êm" – Theatre
"Dẫu Có Lỗi Lầm" – Semi-final
"Đường Xưa" – Piano
"60 Năm Cuộc Đời" (Y Vân) – Top 10
"Rồi Mai Thức Giấc" (Tường Văn) – Top 9
"Tôi Tìm Thấy Tôi" (Đức Trí) – Top 8
"Tạm Biệt" (Hồ Hoài Anh) – Top 7
"Xin Cho Tôi" (Trịnh Công Sơn) – Top 6
"Chị Tôi" (Trọng Đài) – Top 5
"Ngỡ Đâu Tình Đã Quên Mình" (Lê Hựu Hà) – Top 4
"Đêm Đô Thị"- Y Vân- Top 4
"Mong Ước Kỷ Niệm Xưa" (Xuân Phương) – Top 3
"Nhé Anh" (Nguyễn Hà) – Top 3
"Từng Ngày Dài" (Đức Trí) – Top 2
"Thương Nhau Ngày Mưa" – Top 2
"Nếu Có Yêu Tôi" – Top 2
"60 Mươi Năm Cuộc Đời" – Grand Finale
"Rồi Mai Thức Giấc" – Grand Finale
"Nụ Cười Và Những Ước Mơ" (Đức Trí) – Grand Finale

Asian Idol
She represented Vietnam in the first Asian Idol competition, held in December 2007, but lost to Singapore's Hady Mirza.

Asian Idol Performances
"River Deep - Mountain High" by Ike & Tina Turner
"Lúc Mới Yêu" by Phương Vy
"I Love Rock 'n' Roll" with Siu Black by Arrows

Discography
Studio albums
Lúc Mới Yêu (2008)
Có Đôi Lần (2009)
Khung Trời Dấu Yêu (with Quốc Thiên and Anh Khang) (2009)
Mùa Thu Cho Em (with Lê Hiếu) (2010)
Phương Vy 20+2 (2011)
Extended Play
Chuyện Về Người Con Gái (2008)

References

External links
 Phuong Vy Idol on Youtube.

  

1987 births
Living people
People from Ho Chi Minh City
Asian Idol
Vietnam Idol
Idols (TV series) winners
21st-century Vietnamese women singers